Paziella pazi, common name : Paz's murex, is a species of sea snail, a marine gastropod mollusk in the family Muricidae, the murex snails or rock snails.

Description
The adult shell grows to a length of 25 mm to 50 mm.

Distribution
This species is distributed in the Gulf of Mexico, the Caribbean Sea (including Cuba and Belize) and off the coast of Florida.

References

 Rosenberg, G., F. Moretzsohn, and E. F. García. 2009. Gastropoda (Mollusca) of the Gulf of Mexico, pp. 579–699 in Felder, D.L. and D.K. Camp (eds.), Gulf of Mexico–Origins, Waters, and Biota. Biodiversity. Texas A&M Press, College Station, Texas
 Merle D., Garrigues B. & Pointier J.-P. (2011) Fossil and Recent Muricidae of the world. Part Muricinae. Hackenheim: Conchbooks. 648 pp. page(s): 164

External links
 

Muricidae
Gastropods described in 1869